Bazlur Rahman may refer to:

 Bazlur Mohamed Rahman (born 1959), Bangladeshi swimmer
 Bazlur Rahman (journalist) (1941–2008), Bangladeshi writer and journalist
 Bazlur Rahman Badal (1921/1922 – 2018), Bangladeshi dancer who won the Independence Day Award